Padalarang HSR Station is a large class A-type KCIC station located on Kertajaya, West Bandung Regency, West Java, Indonesia. The station, which is located at an altitude of +52,224 meters, is only serves the upcoming KCIC Jakarta-Bandung route. To the south of this station is Padalarang Station.

References 

Railway stations in West Java
Railway stations scheduled to open in 2023
Proposed rail infrastructure in Indonesia